Wizard of Wor is an arcade game released in 1980 by Midway. Up to two players fight together in a series of monster-infested mazes, clearing each maze by shooting the creatures. The game was ported to the Atari 8-bit family, Commodore 64, Atari 2600, and Atari 5200 and renamed to The Incredible Wizard for the Bally Astrocade. The original cartridge came with a cash prize offer to the first person to complete the game.

Gameplay

The players' characters, called Worriors, must kill all the monsters by shooting them. Player one has yellow Worriors, on the right, and player two has blue Worriors, on the left. In a two-player game, the players are also able to shoot each other's Worriors, earning bonus points and causing the other player to lose a life. Team-oriented players can successfully advance through the game by standing back-to-back (such as in a corner) and firing at anything that comes at them.

Each dungeon consists of a single-screen rectangular grid with walls and corridors in various formations. The Worriors and the monsters can travel freely through the corridors. Each dungeon has doors at the left and right edges, which connect with each other, making the dungeon wrap around. Whenever a door is traversed by a player or monster, both doors deactivate for a short period, making them impassable. A player who exits the door can pop back through the door immediately when the Worluk or Wizard is in the dungeon. A small radar display indicates the positions of all active monsters.

As long as a player has at least one life in reserve, a backup Worrior is displayed in a small sealed cubbyhole at the corresponding bottom corner of the dungeon. When the current Worrior is killed, the cubbyhole opens and the player has 10 seconds to move the backup into play before automatically being forced in.

The various monsters include the following:
 Burwor: A blue wolf-type creature. 
 Garwor: A yellow Tyrannosaurus rex-type creature.
 Thorwor: A red scorpion-like creature.
 Worluk: An Insectoid-type creature.
 Wizard of Wor: A blue wizard.

Both Garwors and Thorwors have the ability to turn invisible at times, but will always appear on the radar. All enemies except the Worluk can shoot at the Worriors.

Each dungeon starts filled with six Burwors. In the first dungeon, killing the last Burwor will make a Garwor appear; in the second, the last two Burwors are replaced by Garwors when killed; and so on. From the sixth dungeon on, a Garwor will replace every Burwor when killed. On every screen, killing a Garwor causes a Thorwor to appear. There will never be more than six enemies on the screen at once. From the second dungeon on, after the last Thorwor is killed, a Worluk will appear and try to escape through one of the side doors. The level ends when the Worluk either escapes or is killed; in the latter case, all point values for the next dungeon are doubled.

The Wizard of Wor will appear in or after the second dungeon once the Worluk has either escaped or been killed. After a few seconds the Wizard will disappear and teleport across the dungeon, gradually approaching a Worrior. The Wizard remains in the dungeon until he shoots a Worrior or is killed. He uses a speech synthesizer to taunt the players throughout the game.

Players are referred to as "Worriors" during the first seven levels, then as "Worlords" beyond that point. The "Worlord Dungeons" are more difficult than the earlier levels because they have fewer interior walls.

There are two special dungeons with increased difficulty. Level 4 is "The Arena", with a large open area in its center, and Level 13 is "The Pit", with no interior walls at all. A bonus Worrior is awarded before each of these levels. Every sixth dungeon after Level 13 is another Pit. A player who survives any Pit level without losing a life earns the title of "Worlord Supreme".

Each dungeon begins with a dramatic rendition of the five-note opening from "Danger Ahead" - the theme to the radio and television series Dragnet - with the fifth note only playing on the "double score dungeon" screen.

Reception
Wizard of Wor was moderately successful in arcades.

Electronic Games called the Atari 8-bit version "outstanding". It similarly praised the arcade version, stating that while one-person and competitive two-person play was excellent, two people cooperating was "a unique playing experience".

Danny Goodman of Creative Computing Video & Arcade Games called The Incredible Wizard for the Astrocade "an incredibly good replica" of Wizard of Wor. Video magazine's 1982 Guide to Electronic Games agreed, calling it "a near-perfect translation" of the arcade original. It would go on to be awarded "Best Multi-Player Video Game" at the 4th annual Arkie Awards where it was described as "the finest cartridge ever produced for [the Astrocade]", and the Atari version would be honored at the 5th Arkies with a Certificate of Merit in the same category. In 1995, Flux magazine ranked the game 84th on their "Top 100 Video Games".

Reviews
Games

Legacy
Wizard of Wor is included in the compilations Midway Arcade Treasures 2 (2004) and Midway Arcade Origins (2012).

Wizard Of Wor was also included in the "Arcade 1up Mortal Kombat II" cabinet under the "Midway Legacy Edition Arcade" released in 2021.

References

External links
 
 
 Wizard of Wor can also be played online in a browser
 Commodore 64 box and manual at C64Sets.com

1980 video games
Arcade video games
Atari 2600 games
Atari 5200 games
Atari 8-bit family games
Commodore 64 games
Maze games
Head-to-head arcade video games
Cooperative video games
Shoot 'em ups
Video games developed in the United States